Catherine Bruhier (born 31 May 1972) is a Canadian actress and filmmaker. Born in Belize, she was raised in New Brunswick and has worked in Canada and the United States.

Early life and education
Catherine Bruhier was born in Belize, Central America (formerly British Honduras). Her mother and father were both born and raised in Belize. Her family moved to Saint John, New Brunswick when she was an infant. She has a sister named Emily Bruhier. After graduating from Saint John High School and winning a scholarship and an artistic award, she moved to Toronto to pursue her acting career.

A graduate of the George Brown College Theatre program, she also attended York University. She studied in Los Angeles with director Jim Pasternak.

Career
One of Bruhier's earlier achievements was on the main stage of Theatre New Brunswick, in David French's two-cast member equity play (which ran at Theatre New Brunswick's main stage) Salt-Water Moon, directed by playwright Sharon Pollock and co-starring Eric McCormack from Will & Grace fame. Based on her experience in Salt-Water Moon, she wrote an article called "Darkness Visible" published in the September '90 issue of Theatrum Magazine.

She was one of eight directors in Canada chosen to attend the 2010 Women in the Directors Chair at the Banff Arts Centre.

Bruhier was an invited jury member of the Canadian Academy Of Cinema And Television, choosing the performers to be nominated for the 1995 Gemini Awards. She is a member of Canadian Actors Equity Association (CAEA), Alliance of Canadian Television and Radio Artists (ACTRA), Screen Actors Guild, and previously a member of Women in Film Toronto and the Liaison of Independent Filmmakers of Toronto.

Stage work
Bruhier has performed leading roles in theatres across Canada, most notably: Shaw Festival; Grand Theatre London; Factory Theatre; Theatre Passe Muraille; Theatre Aquarius; Theatre New Brunswick Mainstage & Young Company; Theatre Plus Toronto; and the Dora awarded production of the teen play, Carrying the Calf.

Screen work
Her most notable role was starring in 3 seasons as Elaine Besbriss on the Paul Haggis created series Due South.

She co-hosted two seasons of the children's program The Polka Dot Door, which also aired around the world.

Other screen credits include: Rookie Blue (ABC), Flashpoint (CTV/CBS), Soulfood (Showtime), Yes Dear (CBS), Frasier (NBC), Angela's Eyes & Missing for (Lifetime), Forever Knight (USA/CBS) – and recurring on the ABC soap Port Charles. Bruhier recently played the supporting role in the Universal Studios sequel The Best Man Holiday as Dr. Perkins (directed by Malcolm D. Lee).

Filmmaker
Her short film, The Sacrifice, filmed in Los Angeles through Screen Actors Guild, marked her directorial debut and first project from co-founded production company Breaking Ground Productions. To date the film has screened at 12 festivals and has won four awards. While living in Toronto, she was one of the 2011 grant recipients of the Ontario Art Councils Emerging Filmmakers Grant to direct her 2nd short film Clean Teeth Wednesdays which has screened at seven festivals, and the young lead actress was nominated for a 2014 Young Artist Award.

References

External links

Living people
21st-century Canadian actresses
Canadian stage actresses
Canadian television actresses
1972 births
Belizean emigrants